James Stallworth (born April 29, 1971) is a retired American track and field athlete, primarily known for the long jump. He currently holds the NFHS High School Record for the long jump, with a jump of 8.04 m (26 ft 4 3/4 in) set while winning the CIF California State High School Championships in Norwalk, California on June 3, 1989. Stallworth attended Tulare Union High School, the same high school as the famous two time Olympic Decathlon champion Bob Mathias and Discus Gold Medalist Sim Iness.

Continuing his junior career, he won the USATF Junior Championships in 1990, setting a still standing meet record of 8.17 m (26 ft 9 3/4 in)  which qualified him for the International team.  He was also Junior National Champion at 200 meters.  In Plovdiv, Bulgaria, he won the 1990 World Junior Championships in Athletics, setting a personal record of 8.20 m (26 ft 10 3/4 in) in the qualifying round, the #152 performance on the world all-time list. He also won a Bronze medal in the 200 meters in that same competition. In 1991, as a 20-year-old, he placed second behind Mike Powell in the United States Olympic Festival. Powell would claim the world record in the long jump two years later, a record he still holds.

With such exceptional results as junior athlete, continued success as a collegiate or professional athlete was anticipated. However, after a jail sentence for selling drugs that cost him his scholarship to Fresno State, a downward spiral of drug addiction, criminal activity, and prison sentences followed.

After a 9-year absence from competition, 29-year-old James Stallworth decided to return to competition in 2000 with an eye on making the US Olympic team. He achieving a 7.93 m (26 ft 1/4 in) long jump in a local championship in Long Beach, California. While the result did not improve on his career best of 8.20 m (26 ft 10 3/4 in) set 10 years prior, the leap ranked him 21st in the United States that year. Stallworth participated in the Olympic Trials, but did not make the team.

As of 2017, Stallworth was working as a warehouse worker at a Rescue Mission, living in transitional housing and working on his recovery from drug addiction.

References

External links
 California State Records before 2000

1971 births
Living people
American male long jumpers
African-American male track and field athletes
Track and field athletes from California
21st-century African-American sportspeople
20th-century African-American sportspeople